Grazia Di Michele (born  9 October 1955) is an Italian singer-songwriter.

Life and career 
Born Maria Grazia Di Michele in Rome to parents from Abruzzo, at very young age, she founded with Chiara Scotti and Clelia Lamorgese "L'Ape di Vetro" ("The Glass Bee"), a politically inspired musical group which disbanded after a few years.

She debuted as a solo singer at Folkstudio, a music venue in Rome, in 1977. In those years she also worked in a cultural club in Rome, the "Johann Sebastian Bar", and worked as a disc jockey in radio.

Her first album Cliché, characterized by provocative lyrics about feminist and social themes, was released in 1978. In 1983 she released the album  Ragiona col cuore, of which the title track tells the story of a lesbian love, then in 1986 she got her first and major commercial success with the single "Le ragazze di Gauguin" and with the album with the same name. Between 1990 and 1993 she entered the Sanremo Music Festival three times, ranking third in 1993 with "Gli amori diversi", a duet with Rossana Casale.

Discography 

 Album   
     1978 - Cliché (It, ZPLT 34029)
     1983 - Ragiona col cuore (Venus Dischi, VNS 44701)
     1986 - Le ragazze di Gauguin (WEA Italiana, 242139-1)
     1988 - L'amore è un pericolo (WEA Italiana, 2446311-1)
     1990 - Raccolta (WEA Italiana, 9031 71245; con due inediti)
     1991 - Grazia Di Michele (WEA Italiana, 9031 73859-1)
     1993 - Confini (Warner Music Italy, 4509-91262-1)
     1995 - Rudji (Sony)
     2001 - Naturale
     2005 - Chiamalavita (Rai Trade)
     2005 - Respiro
     2006 - Le più belle canzoni di Grazia Di Michele (WEA)
     2009 - Passaggi segreti (Rai Trade)
     2012 - Giverny (RaiEri)

References

External links 

 
 Grazia Di Michele at Discogs

Musicians from Rome
1955 births
Italian pop singers
Italian composers
Italian singer-songwriters
Living people
Feminist musicians